6s8 or 6S8 may refer to:

 KSVK 12.7 anti-material rifle
 Laurel Municipal Airport, Montana, United States